Couch Fest Films was an international festival of short films hosted in private homes and alternative locations all on one day. The annual festival, which began in 2008 in Seattle, was held worldwide on the same day. Since 2015 it is part of Shnit Worldwide Shortfilmfestival.

History
Couch Fest Films is the largest single-day shorts film festival in the world. From Poland to Portland, Seattle to Slovakia, and Port-au-Prince to Peru, Couch Fest Films is a unique and cozy shorts film fest hosted in people’s houses and alternative 
locations all over the world.

Each year Couch Fest Films presents films from such festivals as Sundance, SXSW, CFC Worldwide Shorts, Seattle Int. Film Festival, and the New Horizons Film Festival to name a few. As the mission is to bring people together with what could be considered "mind-blowing films" each year Couch Fest Films presents over 65 of the very best of 
current short films to a huge audience of cinephiles worldwide.

shnit SHORTS 
In 2015, Couch Fest Films became part of shnit SHORTS, which is a 12-day event for short films held in multiple cities around the world.

Winners

References

External links
Couch Fest Films on Facebook
Couch Fest Films Twitter

Short film festivals in the United States
Film festivals held in multiple countries